Fétique was a family of French bow makers, notable members include Victor François Fétique, Jules Fétique both of whom were awarded Meilleur Ouvrier de France (1st Craftsman of France) and Marcel Fétique.

Family 
Head of the family was Charles Claude Fétique (1853–1911), who was a violin maker. He had two bow-making sons, Victor Fétique (1872–1933) and Jules Fétique (1875–1951), and a daughter Marie Augustine Marthe Fétique (1879–1928). Victor François Fétique had a son Marcel Fétique (1899–1977). Marie Augustine Marthe had a son André Richaume (1905–1966).

 Victor Fétique studied bow making in Mirecourt, working for Charles Nicolas Bazin, before joining Caressa et Français in Paris in 1901. From 1913 he worked independently.
 Jules Fétique worked also for C. N. Bazin before becoming assistant to Eugène Sartory. He joined Caressa & Francais in 1917.
 Marcel Fétique apprenticed with his father Victor Fétique. After his father's death, set up on his own as successor to his father.
 André Richaume apprenticed with Émile François Ouchard in Mirecourt. After that joined his uncle Victor Fétique in Paris. He worked on his own from 1923 to 1957.

References 

 
 
 
 Dictionnaire Universel del Luthiers - René Vannes 1951, 1972, 1985 (vol.3)
 Universal Dictionary of Violin & Bow Makers - William Henley 1970

Bow makers
Luthiers from Mirecourt